Taylan Duman (born 30 July 1997) is a German professional footballer who plays as a midfielder for 1. FC Nürnberg.

Personal life
Born in Germany, Duman is of Turkish descent.

References

External links
 
 

Living people
1997 births
People from Moers
German people of Turkish descent
Sportspeople from Düsseldorf (region)
German footballers
Turkish footballers
Footballers from North Rhine-Westphalia
Association football midfielders
2. Bundesliga players
Regionalliga players
Fortuna Düsseldorf II players
Fortuna Düsseldorf players
Borussia Dortmund II players
1. FC Nürnberg players